Langsdorfia penai is a moth in the family Cossidae. It is found in Chile.

Etymology
The species is named for Sr. Luis Pena, who collected of the species.

References

Natural History Museum Lepidoptera generic names catalog

Moths described in 1957
Hypoptinae
Endemic fauna of Chile